Luis Marín Camacho Caballero (born 2 May 1977) is a Bolivian football manager and former player who played as a midfielder. He is the current manager of Royal Pari's reserve team.

Playing career
Born in Santa Cruz de la Sierra, Camacho made his senior debut with Oriente Petrolero in 1997, and remained at the club until 2001. He subsequently played for Blooming, La Paz FC, Unión Tarija, Aurora and Universitario de Sucre before retiring in 2007, aged 30.

At international level, Camacho represented the Bolivia national team on three occasions: two appearances in 2000 and one in 2002. He made his full international debut on 14 June 2000, in a 2–0 friendly loss against Slovakia.

Coaching career
After retiring, Camacho worked as a youth coach at his first club Oriente Petrolero, before being named interim manager of the main squad on 21 September 2018, after Juan Manuel Llop resigned. He returned to his previous role after the appointment of Ronald Arana, but was again an interim the following 11 July, after Mauricio Soria left.

In 2021, Camacho moved to Royal Pari, as a manager of the reserve side. He was also an interim on two occasions, before renewing his contract on 21 November 2022 and being permanently appointed as manager of the club.

References

External links

1977 births
Living people
Bolivian footballers
Association football midfielders
Bolivian Primera División players
Oriente Petrolero players
Club Blooming players
La Paz F.C. players
Unión Tarija players
Club Aurora players
Universitario de Sucre footballers
Bolivia international footballers
Bolivian football managers
Bolivian Primera División managers
Oriente Petrolero managers
Royal Pari F.C. managers